Aka Moon is the Belgian jazz trio of saxophonist Fabrizio Cassol, bassist Michel Hatzigeorgiou and drummer Stéphane Galland. Aka Moon combines jazz, rock, and world music. In Real Time (2001) was composed for ballet company of Anne-Teresa De Keersmaeker Rosas.

Discography 
On Carbon 7 Records:
 Aka Moon (1992)
 Nzomba (1992)
 Rebirth (1994)
 Akasha Vol. 1 (1995)
 Akasha Vol. 2 (1995)
 Ganesh (1997)
 Elohim (1997)
 Live at Vooruit (1998)
 Live at the Kaai (1999)
 Invisible Mother (1999)
 Invisible Sun (2000)
 In Real Time (2001)
 Invisible Moon (2001)

On De W.E.R.F. Records:
 Guitars (De Werf, 2002)

On Cypres Records:
 Amazir (2006)
 Culture Griot (2009) with Baba Sissoko & Black Machine
 Aka Moon + DJ Grazzoppa's DJ Bigband (2010)
 Unison (2012)

On Outhere Records:
 Double Live: Aka Balkan Moon & AlefBa (2015)
 The Scarlatti Book (2015) with Fabian Fiorini
 Nasa Na (2015) with Pierre Van Dormael
 Constellations Box (2017)
 NOW (2018)
 Opus 111 (2020)

References

External links 
Official Website
 Jazz in Belgium

Belgian jazz ensembles
Avant-garde jazz ensembles